River Plate took part in the Uruguayan Primera División (so called "Uruguayo Especial"), reaching 10th position. Mathías Saavedra was the topscorer with 6 goals.

Transfer Window

Winter 2016

In

Out

Squad

First team squad

Out on loan

Top scorers 
Last update on December 11, 2016

Disciplinary Record 
Last updated on December 15, 2016

Primera División

League table

Results by round

Matches

References

River Plate Montevideo seasons
River Plate